Government of the 1st National Assembly for Wales may refer to:

Michael ministry, the Welsh Assembly Government led by Alun Michael from 1999 to February 2000
First Morgan ministry, the Welsh Assembly Government led by Rhodri Morgan from February 2000 to 2003